Giulio Camus, also Jules  (1 June 1847, Magny-en-Vexin – 25 January 1917, Turin) was a French botanist and entomologist.

Giulio Camus was a professor at the University of Turin. He wrote L'opera salernitana "Circa Instans" ed il testo primitivo del Grant Herbier en français - secondo due codici del sec. XV conservati nella Regia Biblioteca Estense in Memorie della Regia Accademia di Scienze Lettere ed Arti di Modena, IV (1886) and  Les noms des plantes du Livre d’Heures d’Anne de Bretagne J. Bot. 8:325-335, 345-352, 366-375, 396-401 (1894).

References

De Toni G. B.,1918  In memoria del socio Prof. Giulio Camus (1847–1917) 1918 Memorie R. Acc. Sc. Lett. ed Arti in Modena, Ser. III. Vol. XII.

1847 births
1917 deaths
People from Val-d'Oise
French entomologists
19th-century French botanists
Italian entomologists
Academic staff of the University of Turin
20th-century French botanists